In mathematics, cellular homology in algebraic topology is a homology theory for the category of CW-complexes. It agrees with singular homology, and can provide an effective means of computing homology modules.

Definition 

If  is a CW-complex with n-skeleton , the cellular-homology modules are defined as the homology groups Hi of the cellular chain complex

where  is taken to be the empty set.

The group

Then consider the composition

The boundary map

is then given by the formula

Examples 

The following examples illustrate why computations done with cellular homology are often more efficient than those calculated by using singular homology alone.

The n-sphere

The n-dimensional sphere Sn admits a CW structure with two cells, one 0-cell and one n-cell.

but then as all the boundary maps are either to or from trivial groups, they must all be zero, meaning that the cellular homology groups are equal to

When , it is possible to verify that the boundary map  is zero, meaning the above formula holds for all positive .

Genus g surface

Cellular homology can also be used to calculate the homology of the genus g surface . The 2-cell is attached along the boundary of the -gon, which contains every 1-cell twice, once forwards and once backwards. This means the attaching map is zero, since the forwards and backwards directions of each 1-cell cancel out. Therefore, the resulting chain complex is

where all the boundary maps are zero. Therefore, this means the cellular homology of the genus g surface is given by

Similarly, one can construct the genus g surface with a crosscap attached as a CW complex with 1 0-cell, g 1-cells, and 1 2-cell. Its homology groups are

Torus 

The n-torus  can be constructed as the CW complex with 1 0-cell, n 1-cells, ..., and 1 n-cell.

Thus,  .

Complex projective space 

If  has no adjacent-dimensional cells, (so if it has n-cells, it has no (n-1)-cells and (n+1)-cells), then  is the free abelian group generated by its n-cells, for each .  
	

Real projective space

The real projective space  admits a CW-structure with one -cell  for all .
The attaching map for these -cells is given by the 2-fold covering map .
(Observe that the -skeleton  for all .)
Note that in this case,  for all .

To compute the boundary map 

we must find the degree of the map 

Adding the local degrees, we have that 

We thus have that the CW-structure on  gives rise to the following chain complex: 

where  if  is even and  if  is odd.

Other properties 

One sees from the cellular chain complex that the -skeleton determines all lower-dimensional homology modules:

An important consequence of this cellular perspective is that if a CW-complex has no cells in consecutive dimensions, then all of its homology modules are free.

and

Generalization 

The Atiyah–Hirzebruch spectral sequence is the analogous method of computing the (co)homology of a CW-complex, for an arbitrary extraordinary (co)homology theory.

Euler characteristic 

For a cellular complex , let  be its -th skeleton, and  be the number of -cells, i.e., the rank of the free module .

The Euler characteristic is a homotopy invariant.

This can be justified as follows. Consider the long exact sequence of relative homology for the triple :

Chasing exactness through the sequence gives

By induction,

References
 Albrecht Dold: Lectures on Algebraic Topology, Springer .
 Allen Hatcher: Algebraic Topology, Cambridge University Press . A free electronic version is available on the author's homepage.

Homology theory